Brooweena is a rural town and locality in the Fraser Coast Region, Queensland, Australia.

Geography
It is on the Maryborough–Biggenden Road. The north-west of the locality includes a large portion of the Wongi National Park and the Wongi State Forest.

History
The name Brooweena is believed to be an Aboriginal word meaning crab.

The town was established following the arrival of the Mungar Junction to Monto Branch Railway in 1889.

Brooweena Post Office opened on 23 December 1889.

Braemar Provisional School opened on 21 January 1901 and closed on 1 July 1935. It closed in 1922 due to low attendances. It reopened in 1924 and closed on 1 July 1935 and the students were transferred to the newly-opened Woocoo State School (which closed in 1961). Braemar is the name of a pastoral property south of Brooweena.

Brooweena Provisional School opened on 21 March 1904; the first teacher was Eugenie Eveline Hay. It was upgraded to a State School in 1909.

Ballugan Provisional School opened on 12 November 1907. On 1 January 1909 it became Ballugan State School.  It closed in December 1909 but reopened in August 1910. It closed permanently on 30 June 1911.
In 1915, the chambers of the newly established Shire of Woocoo were constructed in the town. This small building survives to this day as part of the Early Settlers Museum operated by the Woocoo Historical Society.

In 1922, the residents of the Woocoo Shire erected a war memorial outside St Mary's Church of England on the Maryborough-Biggenden Road at Teebar (now within Boompa). In 1992 the memorial was relocated to the Woocoo Historical Museum in Brooweena due to concerns about vandalism. It is now known as the Brooweena War Memorial.

Elizabeth Mary Thomas nee Eaton, formerly Mrs B J Nichols, donated land from the property Clifton for a church and cemetery. Subscription towards the building fund were made on the understanding that the church was dedicated in the name of St Mary to the memory of Woocoo Shire soldiers killed in action in World War I. Opening services of the St Mary's Anglican Church were held on 26 October 1919.  The church was built by Matthew Edmund Rooney of Maryborough. There is a group of three stained glass windows behind the altar. In 2019 residents and descendants of past residents attended a 100th anniversary service, and a plaque to commemorate the occasion was unveiled in the church grounds. The church is variously described as being located at Boompa, Brooweena, or Teebar.

A timber mill was established in 1924, ensuring the continuing existence of the town by being its major employer. The mill was destroyed in a fire in 1988 and was rebuilt by local people. On Thursday 28 November 2013 the mill closed as it was no longer compliant with modern safety standards and the cost of modernising the mill would be millions of dollars.

After Robertson Bros Sawmills sold the Brooweena mill to Ken Hall, it was reopened in 2017.

Idalia Provisional School opened on 20 July 1931 and closed on 16 April 1939.

New council chambers were opened in Brooweena on 14 April 1962 by Jack Pizzey, the Member of the Queensland Legislative Assembly for Isis.

The town set an unofficial record in 2009 when 134 people simultaneously played the lagerphone.

In the 2021 census, the population had dropped to 91 people.

Heritage listings
Brooweena has a number of heritage-listed sites, including:
 Brooweena-Woolooga Road: War Memorial Bridge
 Smith Crescent: Brooweena War Memorial

Additionally, Fraser Coast Regional Council has placed the following sites on its Local Heritage Register.-

 Brooweena Sawmill at Corfield Street Brooweena
 Mount Joseph Three Rail Fence at Brooweena Woolooga Road Brooweena
 Woocoo Historical Society at Smith Crescent Brooweena
 St Mary’s Church and Cemetery at Maryborough Biggenden Road Brooweena

Education
Brooweena State School is a government primary (Prep-6) school for boys and girls at Lahey Street. In 2017, the school had an enrolment of 12 students with 2 teachers (1 full-time equivalent) and 4 non-teaching staff (2 full-time equivalent).

There is no secondary school in Brooweena; the nearest are in Maryborough to the east or Gayndah to the west.

References

Further reading 

  —includes information on other schools: Braemar, Woocoo, Teebar East, Teebar West, Boompa, Idahlia, Dunmora, Musket Flat, Bowling Green, Aramara North, Aramara, and Gungaloon.

External links

 
 
 

Towns in Queensland
Wide Bay–Burnett
Fraser Coast Region
Localities in Queensland